Acacia mutabilis is a shrub belonging to the genus Acacia and the subgenus Phyllodineae that is endemic to south western Australia.

Description
It is glabrous branchlets has caducous stipules and can have minute hairs often found within the phyllode axils. The green to green phyllodes have a linear to oblanceolate shape and are straight to incurved. It blooms from August to October and produces yellow flowers. The seed pods that form after flowering are curved or a singular coil.

Taxonomy
The species was first formally described by the botanist Bruce Maslin in 1999 as part of the work Acacia miscellany. The taxonomy of fifty-five species of Acacia, primarily Western Australian, in section Phyllodineae (Leguminosae: Mimosoideae) as published in the journal Nuytsia. It was briefly reclassified as Racosperma mutabile in 2003 by Leslie Pedley then transferred back into the genus Acacia in 2006.

There are five recognised subspecies.
 Acacia mutabilis subsp. angustifolia
 Acacia mutabilis subsp. incurva
 Acacia mutabilis subsp. mutabilis
 Acacia mutabilis subsp. rhynchophylla
 Acacia mutabilis subsp. stipulifera

A. mutabilis is most closely related to Acacia halliana , Acacia merrallii , Acacia simmonsiana and Acacia nitidula.

Distribution
It is native to an area in the Great Southern and Goldfields-Esperance regions of Western Australia from around Gnowangerup in west through to the South Australian border in the east where it is found on sand dunes, undulating plains, depressions and margins of salt lakes where it grows in sandy, calcareous clay, gravelly to loamy soils.

See also
 List of Acacia species

References

mutabilis
Acacias of Western Australia
Plants described in 1999
Taxa named by Bruce Maslin